Stephan Alexander De Freitas Steverink (born 27 February 2004) is a Brazilian competitive swimmer. He won the gold medal in the 400-metre freestyle and the silver medal in the 400-metre individual medley at the 2022 World Junior Championships. At the 2021 Junior Pan American Games, he won a gold medal in the 4×200-metre freestyle relay, silver medals in the 800-metre freestyle, 400-metre individual medley and 4×100-metre medley relay, as well as a bronze medal in the 1500-metre freestyle.

Background
Steverink was born 27 February 2004 to a Brazilian mother and a Dutch father and holds citizenship to Brazil and the Netherlands. He trains and competes for CR Flamengo, continuing his contract with the sports club through the 2024 Summer Olympics and changing his training base to Rio de Janeiro in 2023.

Career

2019–2021
In 2019, Steverink won medals at national age group competitions in both Brazil and Netherlands as part of figuring out which country to represent in international competitions. Two years later, as part of swimming at the 2021 Junior Pan American Games held in Cali, Colombia, he won the gold medal in the 4×200-metre freestyle relay, the silver medal in the 800-metre freestyle with a 8:02.64, the silver medal in the 400-metre individual medley with a 4:24.35, a silver medal in the 4×100-metre medley relay, the bronze medal in the 1500-metre freestyle with a 15:34.41, and placed eighth in the b-final of the 200-metre individual medley with a 2:25.26.

2022
For the 2022 South American Youth Games, held in Rosario, Argentina in April and May, Steverink won a total of four golds medals, one each in the 400-metre freestyle, 1500-metre freestyle, 200-metre individual medley, and the 4×100-metre freestyle relay, as well as a silver medal in the 200-metre breaststroke. At the 2022 World Aquatics Championships, held at Danube Arena in June and July in Budapest, Hungary, Steverink placed sixteenth in the 400-metre individual medley with a time of 4:19.09.

2022 World Junior Championships

For the preliminaries of the 400-metre freestyle on day one of the 2022 FINA World Junior Swimming Championships, held in Lima, Peru, Steverink ranked first with a time of 3:50.24 and qualified for the final. In the evening final, he won the gold medal with a personal best time of 3:48.27, finishing less than two-tenths of a second ahead of silver medalist Vlad Stancu of Romania. With his win, he became the first male Brazilian swimmer to win a medal in the 400-metre freestyle at a FINA World Junior Swimming Championships and he won the first medal for Brazil at the 2022 Championships. On the third day of competition, he placed sixth in the 800-metre freestyle with a time of 8:01.21. The next day, he led-off the 4×200-metre freestyle relay in the final with a personal best time of 1:49.02, contributing to a fourth-place finish in 7:20.13, which was just 0.20 seconds slower than the bronze medal-winning team from Poland.

On the fifth morning, Steverink ranked second in the preliminary heats of the 400-metre individual medley, behind Riku Yamaguchi of Japan, with a time of 4:22.29. In the evening final, he lowered his time to a 4:17.68 and won the silver medal. The following, and final, day, he placed fourth in the 1500-metre freestyle with a time of 15:23.83, which was less than six seconds slower than bronze medalist Vlad Stancu.

2022 U.S. Open Championships
Competing representing Brazil at the 2022 U.S. Open Swimming Championships, starting on 30 November in Greensboro, United States, Steverink won the bronze medal in the 800-metre freestyle with a time of 8:01.80, sharing the podium with fellow Brazilian and gold medalist Guilherme Costa and Venezuelan and silver medalist Alfonso Mestre. The second day, he placed fifth in the 400-metre freestyle with a time of 3:51.60. On the third evening, he finished in a time of 4:21.53 in the final of the 400-metre individual medley to place seventh.

International championships

Personal best times

Long course metres (50 m pool)

Legend: r – relay 1st leg

Awards and honours
 Brazilian Olympic Committee, Year-end Junior Athletes Retrospective, highlight: 2022
 Olimpíada Todo Dia, Youth Athletes Retrospective, highlight: 2022

References

External links
 

2004 births
Living people
Swimmers from Rio de Janeiro (city)
Brazilian people of Dutch descent
Brazilian male freestyle swimmers
Brazilian male medley swimmers